Otto Gunnar Neuriesser (born 16 August 1961, in Karlskoga) is a Swedish former alpine skier who competed in the 1984 Winter Olympics.

References

External links
 sports-reference.com

1961 births
Swedish male alpine skiers
Alpine skiers at the 1984 Winter Olympics
Olympic alpine skiers of Sweden
People from Karlskoga Municipality
Living people
Sportspeople from Örebro County
20th-century Swedish people